Fatima Zaidi (born in 1989) is a Canadian entrepreneur., University lecturer at the University of Toronto, and Co-Chair of Tech4SickKids at SickKids Hospital.

She is the founder and CEO of Quill Inc, a Canadian podcast agency and CoHost, a podcast hosting and analytics tool for brands and agencies.

Background 
Zaidi was born in Muscat, Oman, and moved to Toronto, Canada in 2007.

Career 
In 2016, Zaidi became the VP of Business Development for the Toronto marketing agency, Eighty-Eight. In the same year, she began appearing on segments for BNN Bloomberg on the challenges female founders face in entrepreneurship.

In 2019, Zaidi launched Quill Inc, a branded podcast agency that works with North American brands. In 2021, Quill Inc launched CoHost, a podcast hosting and analytics tool for brands and agencies. 

Since 2016, Zaidi has been an advisor for startup companies Willful and Abacus Agency. In 2021, Zaidi took on a teaching position at the University of Toronto School of Continuing Education to educate students on podcasting.

Community 
In 2020, Zaidi became the Co-Chair of the #Tech4SickKids council for SickKids Hospital.

Awards & Recognition 
Since 2016, Zaidi has won two Top 30 under 30 awards by Marketing Magazine and Bay Street Bull, the Young Professional of the Year by Notable Life, Veuve Clicquot’s Bold Future Award, The Women in Content Marketing Award, Bay Street Bull's Woman of the Year, and one of Flare Magazine’s Top 100 Women.

References 

1989 births
Living people